The 1954–55 Sheffield Shield season was the 53rd season of the Sheffield Shield, the domestic first-class cricket competition of Australia. New South Wales won the championship. The matches were reduced to limit financial losses but the experiment proved to be false economy.

Table

Statistics

Most Runs
Neil Harvey 401

Most Wickets
Pat Crawford 25

References

Sheffield Shield
Sheffield Shield
Sheffield Shield seasons